Robert Maschio (born August 25, 1966) is an American actor. He is known for playing Dr. Todd 'The Todd' Quinlan in the American comedy drama Scrubs.

Early life
He graduated from Columbia University in 1988 with a bachelor's degree in American Politics. He won the Allen J. Willen award for best thesis by a history or political science major.

Career 
Maschio made guest appearances on various TV shows such as Bram & Alice, and he eventually landed the role of a hypersexual surgeon in Bill Lawrence's sitcom Scrubs, playing the recurring character of "Dr. Todd 'The Todd' Quinlan". Maschio also guest-starred in another Lawrence production, Spin City, in 1996, and played a jury member in Veronica Mars in 2005. Another role included the rapist Louis Browning on the daytime soap opera As the World Turns in 2006. In 2011, he appeared as Goldman in French comedy film "Hollywoo" with comedienne Florence Foresti.

Selected filmography

References

External links 

1966 births
Living people
American male television actors
Male actors from New York (state)
Columbia College (New York) alumni